ProbCons is an open source probabilistic consistency-based multiple alignment of amino acid sequences. It is one of the most efficient protein multiple sequence alignment programs, since it has repeatedly demonstrated a statistically significant advantage in accuracy over similar tools, including Clustal and MAFFT.

Algorithm
The following describes the basic outline of the ProbCons algorithm.

Step 1: Reliability of an alignment edge

Step 2: Maximum expected accuracy
The accuracy of an alignment  with respect to another alignment  is defined as the number of common aligned pairs divided by the length of the shorter sequence.

Calculate expected accuracy of each sequence:

This yields a maximum expected accuracy (MEA) alignment:

Step 3: Probabilistic Consistency Transformation
All pairs of sequences x,y from the set of all sequences  are now re-estimated using all intermediate sequences z:

This step can be iterated.

Step 4: Computation of guide tree
Construct a guide tree by hierarchical clustering using MEA score as sequence similarity score. Cluster similarity is defined using weighted average over pairwise sequence similarity.

Step 5: Compute MSA
Finally compute the MSA using progressive alignment or iterative alignment.

See also 
 Sequence alignment software
 Clustal
 MUSCLE
 AMAP
 T-Coffee
 Probalign

References

External links

Computational phylogenetics